The 1999 World Weightlifting Championships were held at Peace and Friendship Stadium in Piraeus, Athens, Greece from November 21 to November 28, 1999.

It was the main qualifying events in the sport for the 2000 Summer Olympics in Sydney, Australia.

Medal summary

Men

Women

Medal table
Ranking by Big (Total result) medals 

Ranking by all medals: Big (Total result) and Small (Snatch and Clean & Jerk)

Team ranking

Men

Women

Participating nations
626 competitors from 87 nations competed.

 (7)
 (6)
 (2)
 (8)
 (12)
 (5)
 (10)
 (7)
 (3)
 (1)
 (15)
 (5)
 (15)
 (1)
 (15)
 (14)
 (14)
 (2)
 (7)
 (1)
 (4)
 (15)
 (7)
 (2)
 (8)
 (3)
 (1)
 (1)
 (14)
 (15)
 (6)
 (11)
 (10)
 (15)
 (5)
 (15)
 (8)
 (5)
 (8)
 (3)
 (5)
 (11)
 (15)
 (15)
 (15)
 (5)
 (8)
 (2)
 (1)
 (7)
 (1)
 (7)
 (6)
 (1)
 (5)
 (7)
 (12)
 (3)
 (10)
 (2)
 (4)
 (1)
 (15)
 (7)
 (3)
 (8)
 (8)
 (14)
 (2)
 (1)
 (1)
 (13)
 (2)
 (13)
 (14)
 (4)
 (5)
 (4)
 (7)
 (4)
 (8)
 (3)
 (15)
 (15)
 (1)
 (4)
 (6)

References
Weightlifting World Championships Seniors Statistics 
Results (Sport 123)

External links
IWF Archive

 
World Weightlifting Championships
World Weightlifting Championships
Sports competitions in Athens
World Weightlifting Championships
International weightlifting competitions hosted by Greece